Galina Pedan (born 29 May 1983) is a Kyrgyzstani athlete who specializes in the 400 metres hurdles.

She finished eighth at the 2005 Asian Championships and fifth at the 2006 Asian Games. She also competed at the 2004 and 2008 Olympic Games without reaching the final.

Her personal best time was 56.16 seconds, achieved in July 2004 in Almaty.

Competition record

External links
 

1983 births
Living people
Kyrgyzstani female hurdlers
Athletes (track and field) at the 2004 Summer Olympics
Athletes (track and field) at the 2008 Summer Olympics
Olympic athletes of Kyrgyzstan
Athletes (track and field) at the 2006 Asian Games
Asian Games competitors for Kyrgyzstan
Kyrgyzstani people of Russian descent
20th-century Kyrgyzstani women
21st-century Kyrgyzstani women